Westerville may refer to one of the following places in the United States:

Westerville, Ohio, the largest Westerville
Westerville, Nebraska, an unincorporated community
Westerville Township, Custer County, Nebraska

See also
Westernville, New York
Westreville, South Dakota
Westville (disambiguation)